Francis Greville (1 July 1667 – 11 October 1710), of the Castle, Warwick, was and English Tory politician who sat in the English and British House of Commons between 1695 and 1710.

Greville was the eldest son of Fulke Greville, 5th Baron Brooke and his wife Sarah Dashwood. He travelled abroad in France, Italy and the Low Countries between 1685 and 1687. On about 26 January 1693,  he married Lady Anne Wilmott, daughter and eventual coheiress of John Wilmot, 2nd Earl of Rochester (who was the widow of Henry Baynton).

Greville was returned as Member of Parliament for Warwick at the 1695 English general election. He was appointed Commissioner for  rebuilding Warwick in 1695. He did not stand at the 1698 English general election, but was returned unopposed at the two general elections of  1701. He voted on 26 February 1702 for the motion vindicating the Commons’ proceedings in impeaching the Whig ministers. He was returned again at the top of the poll in a  contest at Warwick at the 1702 English general election. He was returned for Warwick at the 1705 English general election and voted  against the Court candidate for  Speaker on 25 October 1705. At the 1708 British general election, he was returned again unopposed as Tory MP for Warwick. He acted several times as teller for the Tories, and opposed the impeachment of Dr Sacheverell in 1710. He was returned again as MP for Warwick at the 1710 British general election.  
 
Just a week after his re-election, Greville  suffered  an apoplectic fit  which ended in convulsions. He died a day later  on 11 October 1710 and was  buried at St  Mary's, Warwick.  He and his wife had two sons: 
Fulke Greville, 6th Baron Brooke (1693–1711)
William Greville, 7th Baron Brooke (1695–1727)

He predeceased his father, and the barony passed direct to his eldest son.

References

1667 births
1710 deaths
English MPs 1695–1698
English MPs 1698–1700
English MPs 1701
English MPs 1701–1702
English MPs 1702–1705
English MPs 1705–1707
British MPs 1707–1708
British MPs 1708–1710
Members of the Parliament of Great Britain for English constituencies